The Isuzu MU-X is a mid-size SUV produced by Isuzu. It is a body-on-frame SUV based on the D-Max, and the successor to the MU-7.

The name "MU-X" stands for "Multi Utility – eXtreme".



Predecessor: Isuzu MU-7 (510; 2004) 

The predecessor to the MU-X, the Isuzu MU-7 is an Isuzu D-Max pickup-based SUV with a three-row seating arrangement. The MU-7 was released in Thailand in November 2004, being advertised as a "Sport Utility Wagon". The MU-7 has the same front fascia and chassis as the D-Max but has a covered rear end instead of a truck bed. Unlike the MU-X, the MU-7 retains the same wheelbase as the D-Max. It was only available in some markets such as Thailand, the Philippines and India. In the Philippines, this model is called the Isuzu Alterra.

Since the early launch, the drivetrain choices are 4x2 and 4x4. All come with one engine: the 3.0 4JJ1-TC DDi iTEQ engine. A special suspension set reserved exclusively for MU-7 is called MOVE suspension. The front suspension consists of double wishbone, torsion bar, anti-roll bar, gas-type shock absorber, while the rear configuration is an SUV-type leaf springs via gas-type shock absorber.

In the late third quarter of 2006, the MU-7 range of models was updated and separated as Primo (4x2) and Activo (4x4). With a new 3.0 4JJ1-TCX DDi iTEQ, new transmissions were implemented as well: MUX five-speed manual and MaxMatic-III automatic transmission. Also new was the interior, incorporating a console with wood decoration and new "best" seat upholstery.

And just as for the Gold Series and D-Max, both MU-7 Primo GS and Activo GS also receive gold Isuzu badges in 3 locations. All Gold Series models also come equipped with a new navigation entertainment system incorporating a new reverse assist, all optional from early 2008. Primo and Activo received Wide Vision blind-spot rear view mirror. Also added was the additional new low-cost 4x2 model, the S (with DDI ITEQ 3.0-litre (146 PS)), which was priced below the Primo.

MU-7 Platinum models commenced in the Thai-market on 1 November 2008. Frontal changed a bit by platinum tone, and included a revamped fenders and side trims (by lower tone). All models also received platinum painted engines. MOVE suspension for Activo and Primo models were also retooled. The S model also received an automatic transmission as optional.

MU-7 Super Platinum models were introduced in the same month as D-Max. Exterior changes include a newer front bumper, newer style alloy wheels (except S), and newer blind spot rear view mirrors. Models with 3.0 VGS Turbo also received light silver decorations at the scoop rim.

In April 2011, MU-7 "Choiz" was revealed at the Bangkok Motor Show, with new alloy wheels and small changes to the interior.

In December 2011, the MU-7 "Choiz" was facelifted, with new alloy wheels. It was available in 4WD, 2WD 3000 VGS Turbo and 2WD 3000 Ddi.

First generation (RF; 2013) 

The MU-X had its world premiere in Thailand on 31 October 2013 and sold on 6 November 2013. The MU-X is a product from the collaboration between General Motors and Isuzu. As the result, it shared its platform with the Chevrolet Trailblazer/Holden Colorado. Due to an agreement with GM, the Trailblazer was released prior to MU-X.

In Australia, it was launched in December 2013. To date, the MU-X has been sold only in Thailand, Australia, Paraguay, Indonesia, Philippines, Malaysia, Vietnam, China and India. Isuzu Motors has plans to market it overseas in 50 countries. In December 2013, the MU-X was showcased at the 2013 Tokyo Motor Show, but it is not sold in Japan.

Markets

Thailand 
In Thailand, the MU-X was available in three trim levels, being: Base (CD), Standard (DVD) and High (DVD Navi).

CD and DVD-trim levels are available with the 2.5-litre engine. These trims are called the 2.5 VGS CD and 2.5 VGS DVD respectively. when equipped with the 5-speed automatic (or 5-speed manual, which is 4x2 only). The DVD Navi trim level is available with both the 2.5- and 3.0-litre engines, with the 2.5-litre engine, it is called 2.5 VGS DVD Navi, In 3.0-litre engine with automatic transmission, it is badged as 3.0 VGS DVD Navi.

The 4x4 (which is 5-speed automatic only) is solely available in the 3.0 VGS DVD Navi trim level.

Philippines 
On 9 September 2014, Isuzu Philippines Corporation launched the MU-X to retire the Alterra. It was available in 3 trim levels, LS, LS-M and LS-A. However, only the 2.5-litre engine has been made available due to fuel quality concerns. The two lower variants were only available in 2WD and Manual Transmission while the High LS-A can be had in 2WD or 4WD with Terrain Command.

This engine differs from the global 3.0-litre engine as it is still Euro II compliant and produces less power than the 4JJ1-TCX. Apart from the new engine, a chrome tailpipe finisher, 3.0 TD chrome emblem and daytime running lights are fitted as standard on the 3.0-litre models to differentiate them from the 2.5 models.

In September 2017, as part of the 20th anniversary of Isuzu Philippines Corporation, the heavily revised Isuzu MU-X debuted in the Philippines. The Philippine-spec Isuzu MU-X gets similar features from its Thai-spec model. It gets the newer 3.0-litre 4JJ1-TCX with Blue Power, Euro IV compliant. This new engine also powers the 2018 D-Max.

China 
In China, MU-X was launched in May 2015 and was produced by Jiangxi Isuzu Motors.

Facelift 
On 14 February 2017, the facelifted MU-X was revealed in a teaser video and website. The facelifted MU-X debuted on 4 March 2017 prior to the Bangkok International Motor Show. This facelift including integrated LED front and tail lights, improved interior quality with the addition of soft material, two-tone interior, improved NVH. Engines remained the same as the outgoing model.

Engines

Second generation (RJ; 2020) 

The second-generation MU-X was revealed on 28 October 2020 in Thailand. It shares the same platform with the third generation D-Max, which in turn is also closely related to the third generation Mazda BT-50.

Markets

Thailand 
The MU-X in Thailand is offered with two engine options, which are the 1.9-litre turbodiesel unit and the 3.0-litre turbodiesel engine. The 1.9-litre is used for four variants, namely the 1.9 Active, 1.9 Luxury, 1.9 Elegance and 1.9 Ultimate, while the 4JJ3-TCX engine is exclusive to the 3.0 Elegance, 3.0 Ultimate and 3.0 Ultimate 4WD.

Australia 
The MU-X for Australian market was launched on 30 July 2021. It is available in three grades: LS-M, LS-U, and the top-of-the-range LS-T.

Philippines 
The second generation MU-X was launched in the Philippines on 22 September 2021. It is offered in five grades: LS 4x2 RZ4E A/T, LS-A 4x2 RZ4E M/T, LS-A 4x2 3.0 A/T, LS-E 4x2 3.0 A/T and LS-E 4x4 3.0 A/T.

South Africa 
The second generation MU-X was launched in South Africa on 15 November 2021. It is offered in four grade levels; LS 4x2, LS 4x4, LSE 4x2 and ONYX 4x4. All models are powered by the same 3.0-litre turbo diesel engine.

Indonesia 
The second generation MU-X was launched in Indonesia during the GIIAS 2021. It is only offered in one grade level, a 1.9-litre 4x4 automatic.

Engines

Sales

References

External links 

 Official website (Thailand)

MU-X
Cars introduced in 2013
2020s cars
Mid-size sport utility vehicles
Rear-wheel-drive vehicles
All-wheel-drive vehicles
Cars powered by longitudinal 4-cylinder engines